You Wish is an American fantasy sitcom television series created by Michael Jacobs, that ran from September 26, 1997 to June 19, 1998. It started as part of ABC's TGIF programming on Friday nights for the fall of 1997, along with Sabrina, the Teenage Witch, Boy Meets World, and Teen Angel.

Synopsis
Just as Sabrina the Teenage Witch was considered a 1990s version of Bewitched, You Wish was a 1990s version of I Dream of Jeannie. In this sitcom, a genie lives with a family, instead of a single man.

In the show's pilot episode (in which the proposed series was still known under a working title of Genie), Gillian Apple (Harley Jane Kozak) and her two children, Mickey Apple (Alex McKenna) and Travis Apple (Nathan Lawrence) visit a rug shop where they meet the owner, Madman Mustafa (John Rhys-Davies). There they buy a rug, where they unexpectedly release a genie (John Ales), who has been imprisoned for 2,000 years. The genie's name is simply "Genie", although in the first episode Gillian refers to him as "Steve from Canoga Park", an alias he later uses. Jerry Van Dyke was introduced to the show in the third episode as Genie's Grandpa Max (thus, Van Dyke was simultaneously appearing on two TGIF series, You Wish and Teen Angel at the same time as different characters).

Cast
John Ales as Genie
Harley Jane Kozak as Gillian Apple
Jerry Van Dyke as Grandpa Max 
Alex McKenna as Mickey Apple
Nathan Lawrence as Travis Apple

Production

Crossovers
Although the series made a total of 13 episodes, it was taken off after the seventh episode, "Genie Without a Cause." This episode, which aired on November 7, 1997, was part of a night-long TGIF retro crossover, which started with Sabrina. Sabrina made a time ball, which Salem swallowed and caused the time period to be the 1960s. Salem then crossed over to Boy Meets World, turning it into the 1940s, then this series to the 1950s and then to Teen Angel to the 1970s.

Cancellation
You Wish was a ratings failure, ranking 92nd for the season and was cancelled after seven episodes. Reruns from the first season of Sabrina the Teenage Witch were added to the TGIF lineup to fill the empty slot for the remainder of the season. The remaining six unaired episodes of the series were burned off in May and June 1998, filling the slot of its fellow new TGIF series, Teen Angel, after that show was canceled.

Episodes

Reception
TV Guide called the series "Hammy, artificial, and altogether excruciating".

References

External links
 
 
 https://archive.org/details/YouWish 

1990s American sitcoms
1997 American television series debuts
1998 American television series endings
American Broadcasting Company original programming
English-language television shows
American fantasy television series
Television series by ABC Studios
TGIF (TV programming block)
Television series about families
Television series created by Michael Jacobs
Genies in television